Sainte-Marie-du-Bois is a former commune in the Manche department in Normandy in north-western France. On 1 January 2016, it was merged into the commune of Le Teilleul. Its population was 59 in 2019.

See also
Communes of the Manche department

References

Saintemariedubois